Krokowa is a no longer operational PKP railway station in Krokowa (Pomeranian Voivodeship), Poland.

Lines crossing the station

References 
Krokowa article at Polish Stations Database, URL accessed at 5 March 2006

Railway stations in Pomeranian Voivodeship
Disused railway stations in Pomeranian Voivodeship
Puck County